Godwit Glacier is a glacier that flows northeast from Mount Holm-Hansen into Bartley Glacier in the Asgard Range of Victoria Land, Antarctica. It was named by the New Zealand Geographic Board (1998) after the godwit, a migratory bird which summers in New Zealand.

References

Glaciers of Scott Coast